The following is a list of dams in Aomori Prefecture, Japan.

List

See also

Notes

References 

Aomori